Krishna Kaul (20 November 1921 – 13 December 2008) was an Indian politician. She was a Member of Parliament, Uttar Pradesh in the Rajya Sabha the upper house of India's Parliament as a member of the Indian National Congress.

Kaul died on 13 December 2008, at the age of 87.

References

1921 births
2008 deaths
Rajya Sabha members from Uttar Pradesh
Indian National Congress politicians from Uttar Pradesh
Women in Uttar Pradesh politics
Women members of the Rajya Sabha